French letters may refer to:

French Alphabet
Condom, as used in British English